The 724th Special Tactics Group is one of the special operations ground components of the 24th Special Operations Wing, assigned to Air Force Special Operations Command (AFSOC). The Group is headquartered at Pope Field, North Carolina. The Group is composed of four squadrons, also located on Pope Field.

Overview
The Group's Special Tactics Squadron is made up of Special Tactics Officers, Combat Controllers, Combat Rescue Officers, Pararescuemen, Special Reconnaissance, Tactical Air Control Party Officers and operators, and a number of combat support airmen which comprise 58 Air Force specialties.

Special Tactics Squadrons are organized, trained and equipped specifically for various special operations missions facilitating air operations on the battlefield. They conduct combat search and rescue missions, collect intelligence, as well as call in close air support or airstrikes against enemy combatants and are often partnered with other U.S. special operations forces overseas.

Subordinate units
17th Special Tactics Squadron, Fort Benning, Georgia, 1 October 2020 - Present
24th Special Tactics Squadron, Pope Field, North Carolina, 29 April 2011 - Present
724th Operations Support Squadron, Pope Field, North Carolina, 29 April 2011 - Present
724th Intelligence Squadron, Pope Field, North Carolina, 29 April 2011 - Present
724th Special Tactics Support Squadron, Pope Field, North Carolina, 29 April 2011 - Present

Lineage
 Established as the 724th Training Group on 22 January 1943 and activated on 28 February 1943. Disbanded on 30 April 1944.
 Reestablished, and redesignated as, 724th Special Tactics Group on 1 March 2011 and activated on 29 April 2011.

Assignments
Army Air Forces Technical Training Command, 28 Feb 1943 - 25 September 1943
76th Training Wing, 25 September 1943 - 30 April 1944 
Air Force Special Operations Command, 29 April 2011 - Present

Stations
Army Air Force Training Center #7, Atlantic City, New Jersey, 28 February 1943 - 16 June 1943
Seymour-Johnson Field, North Carolina, 16 June 1943 - 30 April 1944
Pope Air Force Base (later Pope Field), North Carolina 29 April 2011 - Present

Commanders
April 2011 – June 2012, Col. Matthew 'Wolfe' Davidson
June 2012  July 2014, Col. Michael Martin

References

Military units and formations in North Carolina
Special tactics groups of the United States Air Force